Tony Anselmo (born February 18, 1960) is an American voice actor and animator. He has been the official character voice of Donald Duck since 1985 following the death of the original voice actor, Clarence Nash. He has also provided voices for Donald's triplet nephews, Huey, Dewey, and Louie.

Prior to voicing for Disney projects, he became an animator for the company in 1980.  As of 2023, he has been credited in 23 animation roles.

Early life
Anselmo was born on February 18, 1960, in Salt Lake City, Utah.

Anselmo formed an early interest with Disney after attending a screening of Mary Poppins at the age of four. Anselmo says, "I remember leaving the theater and asking, 'How did they do this? Who did that?' and so on...So a seed was planted there, and from that time on I never wanted to be a fireman, an astronaut, or anything else. I wanted to work for Disney."

Anselmo's family moved to Sunnyvale in northern California when he was seven, and he continued to actively study Disney and animation. He began drawing, utilizing the famed Preston Blair art book, Advanced Animation, built a light table of his own, and began creating animation with a Super 8 camera.

He attended Marian A. Peterson High School in Sunnyvale, California. He began night art classes at local colleges and began a regular correspondence with the artists who animated the Disney films, including Frank Thomas, Ollie Johnston, Eric Larson, and Milt Kahl. Anselmo says, "Ollie wrote a lot and sent me drawings, advising me to learn quick sketch, life drawing, and design.”

Anselmo studied at the Character Animation Department of California Institute of the Arts on a full scholarship from the Disney Family in fall 1978.

Career

Anselmo's career as an animator began in 1980, at age 20. In subsequent years, Anselmo contributed to the animation of 20 Disney animated features, including The Black Cauldron, The Little Mermaid, Beauty and the Beast, The Lion King, Tarzan and The Emperor's New Groove. Anselmo was trained and mentored by the original voice of Donald, Clarence Nash, who died in 1985 and Anselmo inherited the role of Donald Duck just as Nash had wished. He first voiced Donald on a 1986 D-TV Valentine special on The Disney Channel.

Walt Disney insisted on character consistency and integrity. As long as Clarence Nash was alive no one other than Clarence was permitted to provide Donald's voice. Continuing in that tradition, in 1988 Roy E. Disney created the department of Disney Character Voices to insure the continuation of character integrity, consistency, and quality in recording methods.

During an interview, Tony Anselmo revealed that “Most people believe that Donald’s voice is done squeezing air through the cheek, that is not true. I can't reveal how it's actually done, but it is definitely not done by squeezing air through the cheek. The Hanna-Barbera character ‘Yakky Doodle’ is done that way. Donald Duck is not."

“Anselmo is the only person to both animate, and voice Donald Duck in “Mickey Donald Goofy: The Three Musketeers”, "Funny You Don’t Look 200”, “The Prince and the Pauper”, and the “60th Annual Academy Awards” in 1988.”

He has voiced the nephews on the TV special Down and Out With Donald Duck, and the shows Mickey Mouse Works and Disney's House of Mouse (while Taylor voiced the nephews in DuckTales, Mickey's Once and Twice Upon a Christmas, Mickey's Speedway USA and the remastered DuckTales video game in 2013.) He also lent his voice to minor characters in The Great Mouse Detective, Mickey's Around the World in 80 Days and Phineas and Ferb. 

Anselmo has also worked as a voice actor for the Kingdom Hearts series, which features Donald Duck as one of three main characters. He also provided the voice of Donald in the video game Kinect Disneyland Adventures in 2011.

Anselmo has been honored with several awards and nominations. He was a winner of the 2014 BTVA Television Voice Acting Award for Best Vocal Ensemble in a Television Series - Children's/Educational for Mickey Mouse Clubhouse; as well as the BTVA Video Game Voice Acting Award for Best Vocal Ensemble in a Video Game - Kingdom Hearts 3D: Dream Drop Distance.

In September 2009, Tony Anselmo was named a Disney Legend by Roy E. Disney.

Anselmo began collecting Disney merchandise at an early age, and is known for his comprehensive collection of Disney posters relating to the works of Walt Disney. This expertise resulted in a 2002 art book, The Disney Poster Book featuring the Collection of Tony Anselmo. Anselmo's collection was used in exhibits at The Walt Disney Family Museum in San Francisco.

Filmography

Film

Television

Video games

Theme park attractions

Animator

Awards and nominations

References

External links
 
 Interview

1960 births
Living people
20th-century American artists
21st-century American artists
American male video game actors
American male voice actors
American people of Italian descent
Animators from Utah
Artists from Salt Lake City
California Institute of the Arts alumni
Male actors from Salt Lake City
Disney people
Walt Disney Animation Studios people
Donald Duck